The 707th Intelligence, Surveillance and Reconnaissance Group (707 ISRG) is a unit of the United States Air Force 70th Intelligence, Surveillance and Reconnaissance Wing located at Fort George G. Meade, Maryland.

The group is the largest group in the 70th ISR Wing with more than 1,900 personnel executing both Air Force and National Security Agency missions. Intelligence provided by the group's men and women serves customers such as the President, Secretary of Defense, Combatant Commanders and warfighters on the ground engaged in worldwide operations, including the War in Afghanistan (2001--2021).

The Group is a key enabler of, and contributor to, AF National-Tactical Integration and Expeditionary Signals Intelligence (SIGINT), as well as the AF Distributed Common Ground System, all of which are focused on providing combat intelligence to deployed Department of Defense personnel. Their mission also includes computer network operations as well as manufacturing and installing communications intelligence equipment for SIGINT missions worldwide.

Additionally, the Group serves as the lead for the Global Air Analysis SIGINT mission which analyzes and reports high-interest aerial activity. Finally, the 707th ISR Group operates the Consolidated Remote Operations Facility, Airborne, providing near real-time intelligence support to ongoing sensitive reconnaissance missions.

Units
Major units under the group include

 22d Intelligence Squadron
 29th Intelligence Squadron
 32d Intelligence Squadron
 34th Intelligence Squadron

 94th Intelligence Squadron
 526th Intelligence Squadron
 707th Communications Squadron
 707th Force Support Squadron

Heraldry
Unit Emblem: Approved on 10 Nov 1972 for 6917th Security Group. Upon inactivation of the 6917th Security Group on 1 Oct 1978, the 6917th Security Squadron (later, 6917th Electronic Security Group) adopted the former group emblem. Modified on 25 May 2010.

Lineage 
 Designated as 6917th Security Squadron, and activated, on 1 Jul 1974
 Re-designated as 6917th Electronic Security Group on 1 Aug 1979
 Inactivated on 15 Jul 1993
 Re-designated as 707th Intelligence, Surveillance, and Reconnaissance Group on 25 Sep 2009
 Activated on 15 Oct 2009.

Assignments 
 6017th Security Group, 1 Jul 1974
 United States Air Force Security Service, 1 Oct 1978
 Electronic Security Command, 1 Aug 1979
 Electronic Security, Europe (later European Electronic Security Division), 30 Sep 1980
 26th Intelligence Wing, 1 Oct 1991 – 15 Jul 1993
 70th Intelligence, Surveillance and Reconnaissance Wing, 15 Oct 2009 – Present

Stations 
 San Vito Dei Normanni Air Station, Italy, 1 Jul 1974 – 15 Jul 1993
 Fort George G. Meade, Maryland, 15 Oct 2009 – Present

References

 70th Intelligence, Surveillance and Reconnaissance Wing factsheet
 707 Intelligence, Surveillance, and Reconnaissance Group factsheet

0707
Military units and formations in Maryland
707